FOCAL (acronym for Formulating On-line Calculations in Algebraic Language, or FOrmula CALculator) is an interactive interpreted programming language based on JOSS and mostly used on Digital Equipment Corporation (DEC) Programmed Data Processor (PDP) series machines.

FOCAL is very similar to JOSS in the commands it supports and the general syntax of the language. It differs in that many of JOSS' advanced features like ranges and user-defined functions were removed to simplify the parser. Some of the reserved words (keywords) were renamed so that they all start with a unique first letter. This allows users to type in programs using one-character statements, further reducing memory needs. This was an important consideration on the PDP-8, which was often limited to a few kilobytes (KB).

Like JOSS, and later BASICs, FOCAL on the PDP-8 was a complete environment that included a line editor, an interpreter, and input/output routines. The package as a whole was named FOCAL-8, which also ran on the PDP-5 and PDP-12. When ported to the PDP-11, the resulting FOCAL-11 relied on the underlying operating system, RT-11, to provide file support and editing. The language definition was updated twice, to FOCAL-69 and a very slightly modified FOCAL-71. A port to the Intel 8080 was also available.

FOCAL is notable as the language in which the original versions of the early video games Hamurabi and Lunar Lander were written. Both were later ported to BASIC, where they became much better known. FOCAL was not popular outside the PDP platform and largely disappeared during the move to the VAX-11. It had a strong revival in the Soviet Union where PDP-11 clones were used as educational and home computers.

History

JOSS 

JOSS was released in May 1963 on the one-off JOHNNIAC computer at RAND Corporation. In RAND, use grew rapidly, and the machine, originally built in 1953, quickly ran out of capability. JOHNNIAC was decommissioned in 1966 and JOSS was reimplemented on a newly purchased PDP-6, Digital Equipment Corporation's (DEC) first "big" machine. Use continued to grow and by 1970, the system was being used by 500 to 600 users across the country and had spawned several innovations such as mobile computer terminals that could be wheeled from room to room and plugged in for quick access.

JOSS was highly influential. It emerged just as time-sharing was being introduced. There was significant interest in man-machine interaction and computers were seeing wider use. Whereas most time-sharing operating systems of the era concentrated on user account and file management, leaving the users to do their own programming, JOSS provided file editing and a programming language in one package. RAND showed the system to a parade of people in the industry.

FOCAL
The PDP-6 was DEC's first mainframe, and JOSS took full advantage of its power and memory capacity. DEC programmers were interested in JOSS, but most of their machines had nowhere near the power needed to run it. Written by Richard Merrill, FOCAL removed features from JOSS as required in order to be able to run in the much more limited memory space of the PDP-8 and other 12-bit machines in the DEC lineup. To achieve this, a major change was made to reduce the amount of temporary data, or state, needed to parse the statements. One noticeable effect of this decision was that conditionals could only be used for branches, in contrast to JOSS, where conditionals can be applied to any statement.

The other noticeable change was to rearrange the keywords so each started with a unique letter. This simplified the parser, which needed to read only the first letter of the command on a line of code, and could then skip forward to the next whitespace character. It would then compare that against an internal list of possible keywords, which was one character per entry. In contrast, JOSS had to continue reading until it had read the entire command word and then compared that against a list containing complete words. Not only did this change save memory in the parser, users could also save memory by typing in only that letter, reducing the size of the source code.

The first version of FOCAL was released in 1968 for the PDP-8. An updated version followed the next year, which was later known as FOCAL-69. The system as a whole, regardless of version, was known as FOCAL-8 when it was ported to other machines in the 12-bit series, including the PDP-5 and PDP-12. It was popular as it was highly efficient in memory use, which was often severely limited on these machines to a few kilobytes (KB). The similar FOCAL-11 ran on the PDP-11 under RT-11.

Processor Technology also offered a version of 8k FOCAL, complete with Lunar Lander, for the Intel 8080-based Altair 8800 system. This was provided for the copying charge of the tape, while the source code was provided for free with other purchases.

BASIC
While FOCAL was becoming popular on DEC machines, BASIC was becoming a more popular alternative on other platforms. By the late 1960s, several companies were making inroads in DEC's minicomputer stronghold, selling similar machines running time-sharing versions of BASIC. Notable among these was the HP 2100 series, running HP Time-Shared BASIC.

David H. Ahl had recently joined DEC's PDP-8 Group, just as the company became interested in selling the machine into educational settings. Due to the popularity of BASIC in the education market, especially with the growing library of BASIC programs from the Minnesota Educational Computing Consortium, Ahl found selling the machine with FOCAL was difficult despite its advantages. As he later noted:

Ahl took it upon himself to produce a BASIC system for the platform, hiring a company he later learned was a single programmer in Brooklyn to produce a version for the 4 kWord PDP-8. DEC began selling packaged versions of the PDP-8 with terminals and the BASIC as the "EduSystem" lineup, with larger systems in the series having expanded versions of BASIC, and in some cases, also FOCAL and FORTRAN. Some PDP-11 based EduSystems were also created.

Ahl then began porting programs from FOCAL to BASIC, notably The Sumer Game (which he renamed Hamurabi), a version of Lunar Lander, and many smaller FOCAL demos. Combining his ports with submissions from outside programmers, he managed to collect enough material to have DEC publish 101 BASIC Computer Games in 1973. The book was an immediate success and ultimately ran through three printings to 1975.

By the mid-1970s BASIC was a standard feature of all DEC machines and FOCAL use evaporated.

Rebirth in the Soviet Union
The PDP-11 had been cloned in the Soviet Union in the 1970s for military purposes. In the 1980s, single-chip variations similar to the LSI-11 were produced that gave rise to a series of PDP-11 compatible home computers. Most notable among several models were the Electronika BK series, released in 1985. These were initially supplied with FOCAL on a ROM cartridge, while a BASIC cartridge was an optional add-on. Later models supplied BASIC by default.

Language
The following description is based on FOCAL-69 as seen in the FOCAL-8 language reference manual.

Direct and indirect modes
FOCAL followed the JOSS model for interaction via a command line interface. This allowed users to type in commands in "direct mode", which were performed immediately, or to prefix them with a line number, in which case they were added to the program if they were unique, or overrode existing code if the same number had previously been used.

The method of operation is similar to BASIC's "immediate mode" vs. "program mode". It contrasts with JOSS, in which all commands, both program and direct, were saved and loaded as part of the user's workspace. This allowed JOSS to have commands without line numbers, which they used for  definitions and other tasks. FOCAL lacked this capability, so those instructions that needed to be loaded and saved became options on other program-mode commands like .

Program statements
Every line in a FOCAL program must start with a line number. As with JOSS, line numbers are fixed-point numbers consisting of two two-digit integers separated by a period. In FOCAL-8, valid line numbers range from 1.01 through 31.99. This makes all lines numbers five digits long when output so that all line numbers align. Statements referring to those lines do not need the leading zeros, for example, .

The number on the left of the period is known as the "group number". Groups provide some level of code organization that is lacking in languages like Fortran or BASIC.

Every line must start with a command keyword following the line number. There is no concept of a "default command" as is the case in BASIC with its optional  statement. Multiple statements can be placed on a single line, separated by semicolons. Usually, the behavior is no different than if the statements had been on separate lines, except in the case of FOR loops.

Commands

ASK
The  command (abbreviation A) will take a list of strings and variables, echo the strings and store the user input in variables. Equivalent to BASIC's .

 01.01 ASK "NAME", NAME
 01.02 ASK "COORDINATES", X, Y
 01.03 ASK "A1",A1,"OMEGA",W,"T0",T0,"DAMPING FACTOR",DAMPINGFACTOR

If the user doesn't enter a number but enters text, the system will convert the initial character to a number with "A"=1, "B"=2, etc.

COMMENT
The  command (abbreviation C) creates a remark. Equivalent to BASIC's . The original manual lists  as a synonym of COMMENT, used to mark empty lines, but this has no internal difference.
 01.01 COMMENT: THE SUMER GAME, BY RICHARD MERRILL

DO
The  command (abbreviation D) branches execution to a subroutine. It is the equivalent of BASIC's . The subroutine is referenced either by group number or line number.
 01.15 DO 7.24
 01.16 DO 8

FOR
The  command (abbreviation F) implements a for loop. When three arguments are specified, the first is the initial value of the loop variable, the second is the increment, and the third value is the terminating value for the loop. If only two values are provided, the first is the initial value and the second is the terminating value, and the increment is set to 1. This is the pattern from FORTRAN's  loops, as opposed to BASIC's  where the increment is the last value, if present. 

In contrast to other parts of the language where multiple statements on a line are independent, the  always runs the statements that follow it on the line before the termination has been met, and then continues to the next line. There is no equivalent of BASIC's .
 01.01 FOR X=1,10; TYPE X,!
 01.02 FOR X=0,10,100; DO 2

A sample FOR loop:
 01.10 ASK "HOW MUCH MONEY DO YOU WANT TO BORROW ?",PRINCIPAL
 01.20 ASK "FOR HOW MANY YEARS ?",TERM
 01.30 FOR RATE=4.0,.5,10;DO 2.0
 01.40 QUIT
 02.10 SET INTEREST=PRINCIPAL*(RATE/100)*TERM
 02.20 TYPE "RATE",RATE,"   ","INTEREST",INTEREST,!

GOTO
The  command (abbreviation G) jumps program execution to the specified line number. It is identical to the same-named statement in BASIC.
 01.05 GOTO 1.01
 02.90 TYPE !!,"TRY AGAIN.",!!!!!;GOTO 1.1

IF
The  command (abbreviation I) provides a conditional branch based on the sign of the expression. After the numeric expression, the IF command can take one to three line numbers. If the expression is less than zero, execution branches to the first line number;  if equal to zero, to the second line number;  if greater than zero, to the third line number. The language lacked relative operators such as greater than, equal or less than. To branch if X > 5, one must compare X - 5.
 02.20 IF (25-25) 2.4,2.3,2.4
 03.01 IF (X) 3.1,3.02,3.1

IF could be short-formed by placing a semicolon (or end of line) beyond the first line number. For example:

 02.20 IF (X)1.8; TYPE "Q"
 02.30 IF (X)1.8,2.50
 02.40 TYPE "P"

In this case the test at 2.20 will cause the program to jump to line 1.8 if the test is negative, otherwise it will continue and type "Q" to the console. Line 2.30 will jump to 1.8 or 2.5 if the value is negative or zero, and otherwise continue to type "P" to the console.

QUIT
The  command (abbreviation Q) terminates execution of the program and returns control to the editing environment.
 01.10 FOR X=-10,1,10;TYPE X
 01.20 QUIT

RETURN
The  command (abbreviation R) branches execution from a subroutine back to the calling location. The following is a sample subroutine for converting a yes/no prompt into a value.
 22.78 COMMENT: 'YES OR NO' SUBROUTINE
 22.80 ASK "ANSWER YES OR NO ?  ",AN
 22.82 IF (AN-0YES)22.84,22.86
 22.84 IF (AN-0NO)22.8,22.88,22.8
 22.86 SET X=2;RETURN
 22.88 SET X=1;RETURN

SET
The  command (abbreviation S) assigns the results of an expression to the specified variable. Equivalent to BASIC's .
 01.30 SET PI=3.14156
 01.60 SET INTEREST=PRINCIPAL*(RATE/100)*TERM

TYPE 
The  command (abbreviation T) provides for output of one or more items separated by commas. Equivalent to BASIC's .

Items can be variables, literal strings surrounded by double-quotes, or a variety of control characters. Control characters can be strung together, for example,  will output three CR/LFs without the need to separate them with commas.

 TYPE [NUMBERS, E1, "TEXT", !, #, :, $ OR %] ...OUTPUT
 01.10 TYPE "HI THERE, GOOD LOOKING.  HOW MUCH MONEY DO YOU WANT TO BORROW?",!
 01.50 TYPE "INTEREST",INTEREST,!
 01.80 TYPE "THE INTEREST FOR",TERM," YEARS",!,"IS",INTEREST, " DOLLARS.",!!
 01.90 TYPE "NEW YORK",!,"WASHINGTON",!,"ATLANTA",!,"DALLAS",!
 02.10 TYPE "X",X,"   ","X^2",X^2,"   ","SQRT",FSQT(X)
 03.20 TYPE ".",#
 02.20 TYPE !!!!!

 also included an optional format specifier indicated using the format , where x is the number of digits to the left of the decimal, and yz is the number of digits to the right of the period. So, for example:

 SET A=67823
 TYPE %6.01,A
 =  67823.0
 TYPE %5,A
 = 67823
 TYPE %8.03,A
 =   67823.000
 TYPE %,A
 = 6.7823E4

Note the extra leading spaces in some examples, padding out the full defined width. Using % alone caused the output to be printed in "floating point format" using the E.

Only the first two letters of the name will be printed, padded with a zero if need be. Arrays elements are printed on separate lines and variables with only one element will be indexed (00). For example:

 TYPE $
 A0(00)=67823

Variables 
Variable names may start with any letter except F (F is reserved for functions) and may contain any sequence of letters and numbers. However, only the first two characters are significant. For example, the following code sample from FOCAL: A New Conversational Language refers to the same variable as DESTINATION and then DES. Internally, both references refer to a variable designated DE:
 01.80 ASK DESTINATION
 02.30 IF (DES-14) 2.4,3.1,2.4

Any variable may be treated as an array, allowing subscripts from -2048 through 2047.

Math 
FOCAL-69 contained five mathematical operators:
  for exponents – the exponent is converted to a 12-bit integer
  for multiplication
  for division
  for addition
  for subtraction

One curiosity of FOCAL was that the operators all had independent precedence, as in the order above. That means that the formula , it would be evaluated in the order 2-(3+1) and thus produce -2. This was very different than most languages, where the + and - had equal precedence and would be evaluated (2-3)+1 to produce 0. This can cause subtle errors when converting FOCAL source code to other systems.

FOCAL was unusual in that mathematical expressions could use, [], and <> interchangeably in matched pairs to establish precedence. For example, the following is a valid expression:

   01.30 SET A=<10*[5+1]*(1+5)>

All of these are the same level of precedence and read left-to-right when at the same level, so this statement will be evaluated [], then, then <>, to produce 360.

The language contained the following built-in functions:
  – Absolute value
  – Arctangent
  – Cosine of argument in radians
  – Natural base to the power of the argument
  – Integer part of the argument
  – Naperian log
  – Random number
  – Sign of the argument; FSGN(0)=1 in FOCAL-69, but FSGN(0)=0 in FOCAL-71 and later versions
  – Sine of an angle given in radians
  – Square root

Other functions
FOCAL also included several special-purpose functions:

  reads a value from the PDP-8's analog-to-digital converters, with the channel number as the parameter
  plots at a given Y location
  plots at a given X location

Environment commands

Running programs 
FOCAL used  in the editor to start a program.

Editing commands 
New lines are entered into a program by simply starting the command with a line number. The editing commands were ERASE (abbreviation E), MODIFY (abbreviation M), and WRITE (abbreviation W):
 ERASE – zero out all variables; this is sometimes used in programs to reset them
 ERASE line number – delete the statement at a specified line
 ERASE group number – delete all statements in a specified group
 ERASE ALL – delete an entire program
 MODIFY line number – allow editing a specified line
 WRITE line number – display the statement at a specified line
 WRITE group number – display all statements in a specified group
 WRITE ALL – display a specified program

File commands 
The file command was OPEN (abbreviation O):
  – prepare to read from the start of a file
  – prepare to write from the start of a file
  – resume input
  – resume output
  – output the buffer and close a file

Library commands 
FOCAL included the ability to manage collections of FOCAL programs as a code library. Programs could call other programs in a chain fashion using LIBRARY CALL, or call a single subroutine in another program using LIBRARY GOSUB. Program names could be six characters long. The LIBRARY command (abbreviation L) had the following sub-commands:

 LIBRARY DELETE [device:]program name – delete a program
 LIBRARY LIST [device:][file name] – catalog
 LIBRARY RUN [device:]program name [line number] – chain a program, optionally resuming at a specified line number
 LIBRARY SAVE [device:]program name – save a program
 LIBRARY EXIT – return to the PDP-8 monitor program
FOCAL-71 added:
 LIBRARY CALL [device:]program name – load a program
 LIBRARY GOSUB [device:]program name [group number] – call a subroutine in an external program

Error codes
Since the interpreter lacked sufficient memory space to store error messages, or even a table of error numbers, FOCAL used a workaround by reporting the address of the error-detecting code as a fixed-point number. For example, the division by zero error was detected it would report , where 28.73 represents the code checking for this error at memory page 28 plus an offset of 73 words, and 01.10 is the line number where the error occurred. Pages in the PDP-8 were 128 bytes long, so this address translates to location 3657.

Changes between versions
DEC released three versions of FOCAL for the PDP-8 series, the original, known simply as FOCAL, and two updated versions, 
FOCAL,1969 and FOCAL,1971. FOCAL,1969 was largely identical to the original, but FOCAL,1971 was major update that added file handling, new mathematics, and a variety of other changes. In contrast to the first two versions, which were stand-alone systems, FOCAL,1971 was based on the emerging OS/8 (then still known as PS/8) and relied more heavily on that operating system for file handling and editing.

FOCAL,1971
One change in the new version was a 10-digit math package for added precision. The  function now returned zero if the input expression evaluated to zero. Previously this would return one. The  now used a better algorithm that produced more randomly distributed numbers.

As all of these options used up limited memory, when started, FOCAL,1971 entered a dialog that asked the user what features they wanted to use.

Comparison with JOSS
FOCAL is, for all intents, a cleaned-up version of JOSS with changes to make the syntax terser and easier to parse. Almost all FOCAL commands have a one-to-one correspondence with JOSS and differ only in details. The most obvious change at first glance is that JOSS is case-insensitive and outputs keywords in mixed-case whereas FOCAL was upper-case only. Additionally, JOSS statements end with a period, making them look like written statements, whereas FOCAL has no required line-ending.

One major difference is that JOSS included a complete set of comparison operations and a boolean logic system that operated within  and  constructs. Furthermore, branches and loops could be applied to any statement, in contrast to FOCAL, where the only operation either could carry out was the equivalent to a goto. For example, in JOSS, one could:

  1.10 Type A if X>10.
  1.20 Type i for i=1(1)10.

The first line optionally prints A based on the value of X, and the second prints the numbers 1 to 10. In contrast, FOCAL lacked the ability to compare values, and loops were applied by skipping to the next line when they completed. The equivalent code in FOCAL would be:

 1.10 IF (X-10) ,,1.30
 1.20 TYPE A!
 1.30 FOR I=1,1,10;TYPE I,!

JOSS' implementation makes common constructs easier to build and more closely match a programmer's intentions, at the cost of making the runtime more complex. For example, JOSS allowed ranges in loops to be described in a flexible fashion like 1,2,3,10(5)50,75,78. This flexibility comes at a cost; in FOCAL the start, stop, and step can be written in a custom in-memory structure and easily updated as the loop is performed, whereas JOSS requires it to reevaluate an expression that may be, but often isn't, more complex.

In order to make the code terser in FOCAL, changes were relatively minor. For example, JOSS'  becomes the slightly smaller FOCAL , while  becomes .

To simplify the parser, some FOCAL options were removed. For example, JOSS could perform multiple assignments with  while in FOCAL these had to be made individual statements, .

Comparison with BASIC
Comparisons between FOCAL and BASIC were inevitable since both languages were common on minicomputers of the same era, and the two languages have much in common in syntax and structure. In most cases, there is a direct conversion of FOCAL code to and from BASIC. For example, to ask a user to input a value, in FOCAL one would:

  ASK "What is your age?",AGE

while in BASIC the equivalent is:

With the exception of a few features that were missing from one or the other, and some relatively minor differences in syntax, the two languages are very similar.

BASIC reversed the ordering of the code compared to JOSS, placing the conditional expression at the start of the line rather than the end; in BASIC one uses  whereas FOCAL used , as in JOSS. BASIC's version has the advantage that the runtime could immediately abort reading the rest of the statement if the expression was not true. In contrast, FOCAL's  was more like BASIC's computed goto, but the  allowed any number of lines as targets, as opposed to only three for negative, zero and positive as in JOSS and FOCAL.

Another major difference between the two is that FOCAL lacked inherent support for strings as data elements that could be assigned to variables. As was the case in early BASICs or FORTRAN versions before the addition of strings (in F77), this limitation was generally avoided through the use of literal strings in input and output commands. It was only when manipulating individual strings, or characters in them, that this became a significant problem.

As string variables were not supported, inputting a string used a kludge that converted any characters typed in by a user to their numeric character value. For example, if one typed  at an input statement, FOCAL would convert the H to "8", the numeric value of "H" in the PDP-8's six-bit character codes ("H" is the eighth letter). It would then interpret the "E" as starting an exponent, then it would try to compute "8" to the "LLO" power, which would take several seconds of CPU time and result in a value of 0.76593020E+103, not a helpful response. Nevertheless, by asking questions that would be responded to using single-letter responses, like "Do you need instructions, Y or N", programmers could test the result against known character values to produce what looked like character input.

FOCAL's PDP-8 implementation used a floating point representation that represented numbers as four 12-bit words, forty-eight bits in total, with thirty-six bits of mantissa and twelve bits of exponent. This allowed for both significantly higher precision and a significantly wider range of values than most contemporary interpreters, making FOCAL a reasonable choice for serious numerical work. This high precision, and good choices for default decimal output formatting, meant that difficulties with binary-to-decimal rounding were not evident to beginning users. For comparison, Microsoft BASIC initially used a 32-bit format, while later versions expanded this to 40-bits. Most BASICs had problems with rounding that led to simple equations resulting in tiny non-zero remainders.

It is generally agreed that FOCAL was more efficient in its use of resources than comparable BASIC systems. On a typical machine of the day, often with 6 to 24 kilobytes of magnetic-core memory, FOCAL could handle larger and more complex programming tasks than BASIC.

Versions and spinoffs 
The Coca-Cola Corporation used a customized version of FOCAL called COKE.

FOCAL was later implemented on the PDP-7, PDP-9, PDP-10, PDP-11, PDP-12, PDP-5 and LINC-8.

The FOCAL manual showed how to add commands to the FOCAL parser, so many sites added specialized commands for operating custom hardware.

The Digital Equipment Computer Users' Society collected many patches and enhancements for FOCAL. There were even major enhanced offshoots of FOCAL, such as FOCAL-W, which added many features, including better mass storage file I/O and even virtual variable memory.

In the mid 1970s DELTA was a more sophisticated version of FOCAL. Program line numbers went from 00 to 99 "parts" and 000000 to 999999 "steps" executed in alphanumeric order. DELTA had some specialized commands for the Tektronix 4010/14 display scope.

In Russia, it saw use as late as the early 1990s in mass-produced home computers of the Electronika BK series.

Microsoft sold a version of FOCAL supplied on paper-tape. According to Raymond Chen, the master tape is missing and FOCAL is no longer available.

Example code
The original Lunar Lander makes an excellent example for examining FOCAL code, as it uses most of the features of the language. This code is from the original, found on Jim Storer's Lunar Lander page.
 
  T "CONTROL CALLING LUNAR MODULE. MANUAL CONTROL IS NECESSARY"!
  T "YOU MAY RESET FUEL RATE K EACH 10 SECS TO 0 OR ANY VALUE"!
  T "BETWEEN 8 & 200 LBS/SEC. YOU'VE 16000 LBS FUEL. ESTIMATED"!
  T "FREE FALL IMPACT TIME-120 SECS. CAPSULE WEIGHT-32500 LBS"!
  T "FIRST RADAR CHECK COMING UP"!!!;E
  T "COMMENCE LANDING PROCEDURE"!"TIME,SECS   ALTITUDE,"
  T "MILES+FEET   VELOCITY,MPH   FUEL,LBS   FUEL RATE"!
  S A=120;S V=1;S M=32500;S N=16500;S G=.001;S Z=1.8
 
  T "    ",%3,L,"       ",FITR(A),"  ",%4,5280*(A-FITR(A))
  T %6.02,"       ",3600*V,"    ",%6.01,M-N,"      K=";A K;S T=10
  T %7.02;I (200-K)2.72;I (8-K)3.1,3.1;I (K)2.72,3.1
  T "NOT POSSIBLE";F X=1,51;T "."
  T "K=";A K;G 2.7
 
  I (M-N-.001)4.1;I (T-.001)2.1;S S=T
  I ((N+S*K)-M)3.5,3.5;S S=(M-N)/K
  D 9;I (I)7.1,7.1;I (V)3.8,3.8;I (J)8.1
  D 6;G 3.1
 
  T "FUEL OUT AT",L," SECS"!
  S S=(FSQT(V*V+2*A*G)-V)/G;S V=V+G*S;S L=L+S
 
  T "ON THE MOON AT",L," SECS"!;S W=3600*V
  T "IMPACT VELOCITY OF",W,"M.P.H."!,"FUEL LEFT:"M-N," LBS"!
  I (1-W)5.5,5.5;T "PERFECT LANDING !-(LUCKY)"!;G 5.9
  I (10-W)5.6,5.6;T "GOOD LANDING-(COULD BE BETTER)"!;G 5.9
  I (22-W)5.7,5.7;T "CONGRATULATIONS ON A POOR LANDING"!;G 5.9
  I (40-W)5.81,5.81;T "CRAFT DAMAGE. GOOD LUCK"!;G 5.9
  I (60-W)5.82,5.82;T "CRASH LANDING-YOU'VE 5 HRS OXYGEN"!;G 5.9
  T "SORRY,BUT THERE WERE NO SURVIVORS-YOU BLEW IT!"!"IN "
  T "FACT YOU BLASTED A NEW LUNAR CRATER",W*.277777," FT.DEEP."
  T !!!!"TRY AGAIN?"!
  A "(ANS. YES OR NO)"P;I (P-0NO)5.94,5.98
  I (P-0YES)5.92,1.2,5.92 
  T "CONTROL OUT"!!!;Q
 
  S L=L+S;S T=T-S;S M=M-S*K;S A=I;S V=J
 
  I (S-.005)5.1;S S=2*A/(V+FSQT(V*V+2*A*(G-Z*K/M)))
  D 9;D 6;G 7.1
 
  S W=(1-M*G/(Z*K))/2;S S=M*V/(Z*K*(W+FSQT(W*W+V/Z)))+.05;D 9
  I (I)7.1,7.1;D 6;I (-J)3.1,3.1;I (V)3.1,3.1,8.1
 
  S Q=S*K/M;S J=V+G*S+Z*(-Q-Q^2/2-Q^3/3-Q^4/4-Q^5/5)
  S I=A-G*S*S/2-V*S+Z*S*(Q/2+Q^2/6+Q^3/12+Q^4/20+Q^5/30)

The program is cleanly separated into many subroutines. This was almost universal in FOCAL programs (and JOSS), as the line number scheme made such constructs easy to use. This program uses nine routines. The first, group 1, simply prints out the instructions using the ype statement and sets the initial values for the run. Also note the rase at the end of line , which resets all the variable values.

The main game loop is driven by group 2. As the code "falls" through group 1 into group 2 during the first run, the initial values are printed out in the first two lines. Line  tests the user's input against several possibilities, if it is over 200 or below 8 it types "NOT POSSIBLE" and a row of periods, and then loops back to ask the user to try again. If the value is between these values, it jumps forward to group 3. Note that the limited capabilities of FOCAL's  command are evident here, in BASIC this could be reduced to a single 

Group 3 first tests to see if the fuel has run out, and jumps to group 4 if it has. Line  tests to see if the amount of fuel burned this period, will reduce the mass of the vehicle as a whole, beyond the empty weight, N. If not, it moves on, if it will, it instead sets the loop timer to the amount of time the remaining fuel will burn, thus ending the loop early. In either case, it calls group 9 to update the velocity and position. It then loops over groups 7, 8 and 9 until the value of I converges.

In the latter cases, it will jump to group 4 and fall through to group 5, or jump to group 5 directly. Group 5 types the end-of-game results and then asks the user if they'd like to try again.

See also
JOSS, the Rand language that inspired FOCAL
MUMPS, a data-manipulation language based on JOSS and FOCAL concepts

References

Bibliography

External links
FOCAL source code, FOCAL source for several programs, including Lunar Lander, Sumer Game, and others
DEC's FOCAL 1969 Promotional Booklet
The Computer History Simulation Project (Focal is available as a free download here)
ftp://www.cozx.com/pub/langs/focal.tar.gz C-source version that runs under several operating systems, including Linux
the C-source for a modern DOS version suitable for teaching  
Abramov V.A. Dialogue language FOCAL (in Russian) 
Osetinsky L.G. FOCAL for mini-computers (in Russian) 
Фокал снаружи и изнутри. (пишется) – FOCAL outside and inside. (in progress) (in Russian)
Файл справки к фокалу-1б – Help file for FOCAL-1B (in Russian)

JOSS programming language family
Digital Equipment Corporation